Five-time defending champion Bill Tilden defeated Bill Johnston in the final, 4–6, 11–9, 6–3, 4–6, 6–3 to win the men's singles tennis title at the 1925 U.S. National Championships. It was Tilden's sixth U.S. Championships title and his eight major title overall.

Draw

Final eight

Earlier rounds

References

Men's singles
1925